Seyyed Shahab (also Romanized as Seyyed Shahāb) is a village in Dinavar Rural District, Dinavar District, Sahneh County, Kermanshah Province, Iran. At the 2006 census, its population was 92, in 23 families.

References 

Populated places in Sahneh County